Prem Tapasya is a 1983 Hindi-language romance film, produced by Akkineni Nageswara Rao under the Annapurna Studios banner and directed by Dasari Narayana Rao. It stars Jeetendra, Reena Roy, Rekha with music composed by Laxmikant Pyarelal. The film is a remake of the Telugu blockbuster movie Premabhishekam (1981), starring Akkineni Nageswara Rao, Sridevi, Jayasudha. Both the movies are made by the same banner and director. The Hindi film was a flop.

Plot
The film begins with Mohan Kumar Verma squabbling and falling for a charming Devi. Devi rejects his love at first but has. change of heart on seeing his wholeheartedness and starts to adore him. Elders decide to get them married. Just before the wedding, Devi's brother Dr. Nandalal Kumar Singh finds out Mohan is terminally ill with cancer, and cancels the wedding.  Mohan and Devi decide to get married secretly and then, Mohan finds out about his illness from Dr. Chowdary. 

Mohan finds out that his close friend Ashok is also in love with Devi. In a bid to estrange Devi, Mohan starts frequenting the house of nautch girl Bela. A furious Devi decides to get married to Ashok and teach Mohan a lesson. Aspiring to live as a true wife, Bela requests Mohan to marry her for a fee. Mohan accepts her proposal. His health deteriorates rapidly. Soon after her wedding, Devi learns the truth and rushes along with Ashok, to meet Mohan. The film ends with Mohan blessing the newly wedded couple and breathing his last.

Cast
Jeetendra as Mohan Kumar Verma
Rekha as Bela
Reena Roy as Devi Singh
Vinod Mehra as Ashok
Anita Raj as Anita
Ashok Kumar as Dr. Chowdhary
Prem Chopra as Dr. Nandlal Kumar Singh 
Om Shivpuri as Ram Kumar Verma 
Dinesh Hingoo as Lachhu
Ashalata Wabgaonkar as Mrs. Pratibha Kumar Verma
Dina Pathak as Naniji 
Agha as Pandit
Harish Kumar

Soundtrack 
Lyrics: Anand Bakshi

References

1983 films
1980s Hindi-language films
Films directed by Dasari Narayana Rao
Films scored by Laxmikant–Pyarelal
Hindi remakes of Telugu films
Indian films about cancer